Cho Jun-Ho (born 16 December 1988 in Busan) is a South Korean judoka. He won a bronze medal in the 66 kg event at the 2012 Summer Olympics. He currently coaches the Korean National Women's Judo team.

In addition to his judo career, Cho has also made numerous  appearances on the Korean television sports variety show Cool Kiz on the Block as a coach. His appearances on the show made news headlines and he became highly searched on Korean search rankings after airings of the show due to his unexpected humour and wit.

Family
Cho's family consists of his mother, father, and two brothers, all of whom have made guest appearances on the Korean television sports variety show Cool Kiz on the Block. They were nicknamed "the Judo Family" due to the whole family being highly involved in different aspects of the sport. Cho's identical twin brother, Cho Jun-hyun, was also a member of the Korean national judo team. His youngest brother, Cho Jun-hwi, is on the Korean judo national reserve team.

Education
Samsung Middle School 
Busan Sport High School 
Yongin University

Filmography

Television shows

References

External links
 
 

Judoka at the 2012 Summer Olympics
Olympic judoka of South Korea
Living people
1988 births
Sportspeople from Busan
Olympic medalists in judo
Olympic bronze medalists for South Korea
Medalists at the 2012 Summer Olympics
South Korean male judoka
21st-century South Korean people